Dorcadida is a genus of longhorn beetles of the subfamily Lamiinae, containing the following species:

 Dorcadida bilocularis White, 1846
 Dorcadida walkeri Gahan, 1893

References

Parmenini